Anu Viheriäranta (born 1982) is a Finnish ballet dancer. She joined the Dutch National Ballet in 2005 becoming a principal dancer in 2010.

Biography
Born in Helsinki, Viheriäranta showed an interest in dance as a small child when she began dancing in her room. As a result, her mother took her to dancing classes. She went on to study at the Helsinki Dance Institute and at the Royal Ballet School in London. She was a soloist with the Finnish National Ballet from 1999 where her roles included Juliet in Cranko's Romeo and Juliet and Nikiya in La Bayadère. She also took leading roles in Giselle, Swan Lake and Raymonda.

Awards
Anu Viheriäranta has received a number of awards including:
1997: Prix d'Espoir  
1998: Prix de Lausanne
2010: Nominated for outstand dancer of the year 2010 by Dance Europe magazine
2010: Nominated for Benois de la Danse

References

Finnish ballerinas
Dutch National Ballet principal dancers
Prima ballerinas
1982 births
Living people
Dancers from Helsinki